The 1968 Chicago White Sox season was the team's 68th season in the major leagues, and its 69th season overall. They finished with a record of 67–95, good enough for eighth place in the American League, 36 games behind the first-place Detroit Tigers.

Offseason 
 October 16, 1967: Smoky Burgess was released by the White Sox.
 October 26, 1967: Marv Staehle was sent by the White Sox to the Cleveland Indians to complete an earlier deal (the White Sox traded Jim King and a player to be named later to the Indians for Rocky Colavito) made on July 29, 1967.
 November 29, 1967: Don Buford, Roger Nelson and Bruce Howard were traded by the White Sox to the Baltimore Orioles for Luis Aparicio, Russ Snyder and John Matias.
 December 15, 1967: Tommie Agee and Al Weis were traded by the White Sox to the New York Mets for Tommy Davis, Jack Fisher, Billy Wynne, and Buddy Booker.
 February 13, 1968: Dennis Higgins, Steve Jones, and Ron Hansen were traded by the White Sox to the Washington Senators for Tim Cullen, Buster Narum and Bob Priddy.

Regular season 
The White Sox played in 74 games that were decided by a one run margin, which is an all-time American League record. In those games, the team had a record of 30–44. The 44 one run losses are an all-time MLB record.

Season standings

Record vs. opponents

Opening Day lineup 
 Luis Aparicio, SS
 Tommy McCraw, 1B
 Tommy Davis, LF
 Pete Ward, RF
 Ken Boyer, 3B
 Duane Josephson, C
 Ken Berry, CF
 Tim Cullen, 2B
 Joel Horlen, P

Notable transactions 
 June 7, 1968: Rich McKinney was drafted by the White Sox in the 1st round (14th pick) of the 1968 Major League Baseball draft.
 July 20, 1968: Wayne Causey was traded by the White Sox to the California Angels for Woodie Held.
 July 26, 1968: Don McMahon was traded by the White Sox to the Detroit Tigers for Dennis Ribant.
 August 2, 1968: Tim Cullen was traded by the White Sox to the Washington Senators for Ron Hansen.

Roster

Player stats

Batting 
Note: G = Games played; AB = At bats; R = Runs scored; H = Hits; 2B = Doubles; 3B = Triples; HR = Home runs; RBI = Runs batted in; BB = Base on balls; SO = Strikeouts; AVG = Batting average; SB = Stolen bases

Pitching 
Note: W = Wins; L = Losses; ERA = Earned run average; G = Games pitched; GS = Games started; SV = Saves; IP = Innings pitched; H = Hits allowed; R = Runs allowed; ER = Earned runs allowed; HR = Home runs allowed; BB = Walks allowed; K = Strikeouts

Farm system

Notes

References 
 1968 Chicago White Sox at Baseball Reference

Chicago White Sox seasons
Chicago White Sox season
Chicago